White plague may refer to:
 Great white plague or tuberculosis
 White plague (intermetallic), a white gold-aluminium intermetallic compound
 White plague (coral disease), a disease caused by Aurantimonas coralicida bacteria
 The White Plague, a 1982 science fiction novel by Frank Herbert

See also
 Black plague, a massively deadly plague of the 1300s
 Purple plague, an intermetallic compound of gold and aluminium
 Red plague (disambiguation)
 The White Disease, a 1937 play by Karel Capek